Daniel Conceicao Silva (born October 10, 1970) is a former Brazilian football player.

Club statistics

References

External links

kyotosangadc

1970 births
Living people
Brazilian footballers
Brazilian expatriate footballers
Expatriate footballers in Japan
J1 League players
Kyoto Sanga FC players
Vissel Kobe players
Association football midfielders